The Cincu is a right tributary of the river Olt in Romania. It discharges into the Olt in Cincșor.

References

Rivers of Romania
Rivers of Brașov County